The Basket of Flowers egg is a jewelled enameled Easter egg made under the supervision of the Russian jeweller Peter Carl Fabergé in 1901.  The Fabergé egg was made for Nicholas II of Russia, who presented it to his wife, the Empress Alexandra Feodorovna.

If the egg originally came with a surprise (as the majority of Imperial Easter eggs) is unknown. There is no evidence on the objet d'art that it ever had another piece attached or with it and no document or photograph has been found proving the existence of an accompanying surprise. The egg was executed by one of Fabergé's workmasters, but the name of the workmaster was not recorded and the egg itself bears no maker's marks or other hallmarks of its manufacture, at one point leading to some doubts as to its authenticity.  It is designed as an egg-shaped silver-gilt oyster guilloche basket containing a bouquet of blossoms of mock orange, daisies, pansies, calla lilies, cornflowers, morning glories, and oats,  with the date "1901" displayed on the front in diamonds.  The egg stands on a blue enameled pedestal (not its original— the original white enamel was likely damaged during the Russian Revolution and has been replaced/ re-enameled with the current blue seen today), and is surmounted by an arcing basket handle of gold and diamonds.  Base and egg are also decorated in a trellis work of diamonds.

History
Though the existence of the egg has been clear since its manufacture, its authenticity as an "imperial" egg (i.e., an egg made in Fabergé's workshop and intended as an Easter gift for either the Czar's wife or his mother) was in doubt for some time.  Beginning in 1949, some authorities began to identify the egg as being a non-imperial Fabergé creation; then, in 1979, other authorities began to claim that it was the work of another jeweller altogether, a Boucheron of Paris who had imitated Fabergé.  In 1991 experts finally agreed that this egg was indeed the 1901 Easter gift of Nicholas II of Russia to his wife, and was made by the House of Fabergé for this purpose, officially making it an imperial Fabergé egg.

In 1933, the egg was sold by the Antikvariat (a Soviet institution) probably to Emanuel Snowman of London antique dealers Wartski, and it was acquired by Mary of Teck, and inherited by Queen Elizabeth II in 1953. It remains in the Royal Collection.

The invoice issued by Fabergé in 1901 specifies: "Easter egg, white enamel. Basket with bouquet of wild flowers, with 4176 rose-cut diamonds and 10 pearls" (English translation). For years it was believed that the piece had no pearls and that they might have been connected with a possible surprise. In 2019, at the request of a Fabergé enthusiast, an examination of the object by the Royal Collection Trust staff proved that the egg originally had the ten pearls mentioned in the invoice.

See also
Egg decorating

Notes

References

Sources

External links

Images of the Basket of Flowers Egg, Buckingham Palace Royal Fabergé exhibition (Flickr).
A detailed article on the 'Basket of Wild Flowers' egg from wintraecken.nl
Details of the egg on the Royal Collection Trust online collection pages

1901 works
Imperial Fabergé eggs
Fabergé eggs of the Royal Collection of the United Kingdom